Emison is an unincorporated community and census-designated place (CDP) in Busseron Township, Knox County, Indiana. Its population was 154 at the 2010 census.

History
Emison was laid out in 1867 for Samuel A. Emison. The Emison post office was discontinued in 1994.

Geography
U.S. Routes 41 and 150, a four-lane highway, passes through the east side of the community, leading south  to Vincennes, the county seat, and north  to Terre Haute. Indiana State Road 550 leads southeast from Emison  to Bruceville.

Demographics

References

Census-designated places in Knox County, Indiana
Census-designated places in Indiana